Lunca is a commune in Mureș County, Transylvania, Romania. It is composed of five villages: Băița (Mezőbanyica), Frunzeni (Mezőharasztos), Logig (Szászludvég), Lunca and Sântu (Mezőszentandrás).

See also
List of Hungarian exonyms (Mureș County)

References

Communes in Mureș County
Localities in Transylvania